Martellus is a given name. Notable people with the name include:

Henricus Martellus Germanus (fl. 1480–1496), German geographer and cartographer
Martellus Bennett (born 1987), American football player

Masculine given names